The 2021 FC Shakhter Karagandy season was the 31st successive season that the club played in the Kazakhstan Premier League, the highest tier of association football in Kazakhstan. Shakhter Karagandy finished the season in sixth position. where runners up in the Kazakhstan Cup and were knocked out of the Europa Conference League by Maccabi Tel Aviv at the Play Off stage.

Season events
On 20 January, Shakhter Karagandy announced Ali Aliyev as their new manager.

On 28 January, Shakhter Karagandy announced the return of goalkeeper Igor Shatskiy from Tobol, and defender Mikhail Gabyshev from Caspiy.

On 4 February, Ivan Graf joined Shakhter Karagandy from Kaisar, with Vuk Mitošević joining from Radnik Surdulica on 14 February.

On 22 February, Ararat Yerevan announced that midfielder Solomon Udo had left the club to join Shakhter Karagandy.

On 25 February, Shakhter Karagandy announced the signing of Yevhen Pavlov, and Joseph Adah.

On 28 February, Shakhter Karagandy announced the signings of Yeskendir Kybyray from Zhetysu and Karam Sultanov from Sumgayit.

On 2 March, Shakhter Karagandy announced the signing of Vitaliy Balashov.

On 15 March, Shakhter Karagandy announced the signing of David Atanaskoski.

On 10 April, after suffering 5 defeats in 6 games, Head Coach Ali Aliyev resigned from his position, with Andrei Finonchenko being appointed as Caretaker. The following day, 11 April, Shakhter Karagandy announced the signing of Ziguy Badibanga, who'd previously played for Ordabasy during the 2020 season.

On 16 April, Shakhter Karagandy announced Magomed Adiyev as their new Head Coach.

On 7 May, Shakhter Karagandy announced the signing of Alan Chochiyev and Martin Toshev.

On 13 May, Shakhter Karagandy announced the signing of Yevgeny Gapon from Khimki.

On 22 May, Shakhter Karagandy announced that Yevhen Pavlov had left the club by mutual consent.

On 6 June, Shakhter Karagandy announced that Vitaliy Balashov had left the club by mutual consent.

On 4 July, Shakhter Karagandy announced the signing of Edin Rustemović, with Oralkhan Omirtayev returning to the club the following day.

On 9 July, Shakhter Karagandy announced the signings of Igor Trofimets from Ordabasy, and Pavel Nazarenko from Akzhayik.

On 14 July, Shakhter Karagandy announced the signing of David Mawutor on a free transfer after he'd left Wisła Kraków.

On 15 July, Shakhter Karagandy announced the return of Abdel Lamanje from Astra Giurgiu.

On 17 July, Shakhter Karagandy announced the signing of Yevgeniy Shikavka from Dinamo Minsk, with Vladimir Khozin signing from Chayka Peschanokopskoye the following day.

On 31 July, Shakhter Karagandy announced the signing of Idris Umayev on loan from Akhmat Grozny.

Squad

On loan

Transfers

In

Loans in

Loans out

Released

Friendlies

Competitions

Overview

Super Cup

Premier League

Results summary

Results by round

Results

League table

Kazakhstan Cup

Group stage

Knockout stages

Final

UEFA Europa Conference League

Qualifying rounds

Squad statistics

Appearances and goals

|-
|colspan="16"|Players away from Shakhter Karagandy on loan:

|-
|colspan="16"|Players who left Shakhter Karagandy during the season:

|}

Goal scorers

Clean sheets

Disciplinary record

References

External links
Official Website

FC Shakhter Karagandy seasons
Shakhter Karagandy
Shakhter Karagandy